The Hyde Formation is a geologic formation in central-eastern Oregon. It preserves fossils dating back to the Jurassic period.

See also 
 List of fossiliferous stratigraphic units in Oregon
 Paleontology in Oregon
 Snowshoe Formation
 Posidonia Shale

References 

Geologic formations of Oregon
Jurassic geology of Oregon
Toarcian Stage
Paleontology in Oregon